Kalateh-ye Soleyman (also Romanized as Kalāteh-ye Soleymān, Kalateh Soleiman, Kalāteh Sulaimān, Kalâte-Soleymân, Kalat-i-Sulaimān, Kalāt-e Soleymān, and Soleymān) is a village in Naharjan Rural District, Mud District, Sarbisheh County, South Khorasan Province, Iran. At the 2006 census, its population was 201, in 57 families.

References 

Populated places in Sarbisheh County